Ai Aoki may refer to:

 Ai Aoki (politician) (born 1965), Japanese politician
 Ai Aoki (synchronised swimmer) (born 1985), Japanese synchronised swimmer